Roark Grant Critchlow (born May 11, 1963)  is a Canadian actor. He is known for starring as Dr. Mike Horton on the American daytime soap opera Days of Our Lives from 1994 to 1999.

Career 
From 1994 to 1999, Critchlow starred on the American daytime soap opera Days of Our Lives as Dr. Mike Horton. On June 23, 2010, Roark returned briefly to Days of Our Lives in the role of Dr. Mike Horton. He reprised the role once again on October 4, 2022. He also had a recurring role on the soap Passions in 2003. 

Critchlow was in the television film The Perfect Husband: The Laci Peterson Story, the Lifetime made-for-TV movie Pregnant at 17<ref>{{Cite web|url=https://www.soapoperanetwork.com/2016/02/days-roark-critchlow-and-josie-bissett-star-in-pregnant-at-17|title='DAYS Roark Critchlow, Josie Bissett Star in 'Pregnant at 17'  Soap Opera Network|website=www.soapoperanetwork.com|language=en-US|access-date=August 15, 2018}}</ref> as well as appearing in the Nickelodeon series Drake & Josh as Dr. Glazer. He also portrayed Zoey Brooks' father in Zoey 101. Roark has had smaller roles in movies like Mr. Deeds with Adam Sandler and TV shows such as Street Justice, Malcolm in the Middle, Entourage, Highlander: The Series, Afterworld and Friends.  In 2009, he appeared in an episode of the re-imagined Battlestar Galactica. He also appeared in the 2009 movie Hydra as Sean Trotta. Critchlow recently  had a recurring role on the science fiction TV show V and on the ABC Family drama television series Pretty Little Liars, where he played Tom Marin, the father of Hanna Marin. He was guest starred on Charmed, in which he played a man with the sin of greed.

 Personal life 
Critchlow was born in Calgary, Alberta, Canada and grew up in Summerland, British Columbia. He was a theater major at the University of Victoria, and married Maria Brewer in 1990, with whom he produced and co-starred in Making it Home. They have three children. They divorced in 2006. Critchlow enjoys many sports and was named after Howard Roark, a character in the book The Fountainhead''.

Filmography

References

External links 

1963 births
Living people
Male actors from Calgary
Canadian expatriate male actors in the United States
Canadian male film actors
Canadian male television actors
Canadian male voice actors
20th-century Canadian male actors
21st-century Canadian male actors